João Carlos Pires de Deus (born 6 November 1976) is a Portuguese retired footballer who played as a left back, and a manager. He is the assistant manager of Turkish club Fenerbahçe.

Having played no higher than the second tier, he began managing at age 31 with the Cape Verde national team. He led Gil Vicente and Nacional in the Primeira Liga and was assistant to Jorge Jesus at several clubs.

Playing career
Born in Setúbal, de Deus spent several years associated to local Vitória Futebol Clube, joining its youth system at the age of 15 and making his senior debut in 1995.

During his nine-year senior career, he never competed in higher than the second tier, and represented C.D. Beja, Seixal FC, Lusitano G.C. and F.C. Barreirense, before retiring with his first club Vitória at the end of the 2003–04 season, at only 27.

Coaching career
De Deus started working as a coach immediately after retiring, working with Vitória de Setúbal in the fitness department under José Couceiro and José Rachão; he also had a spell with G.D. Interclube in Angola, again as a fitness coach. His first job as a manager was with the Cape Verde national team, which he left after an unsuccessful qualification campaign for the 2010 FIFA World Cup; shortly before the tournament, he led the team to a goalless friendly draw against Portugal in Covilhã.

In the summer of 2010, and without permission from the Cape Verdean Football Federation, de Deus was appointed at Segunda División B club AD Ceuta. He was sacked by the Spaniards before the end of the year, however, returning to Portugal and joining S.C. Farense, which he could not prevent from being relegated from the third level in spite of an incredible comeback.

From 2011 to 2013, de Deus worked in Portugal's second tier, with Atlético Clube de Portugal and U.D. Oliveirense. For the 2013–14 campaign he was appointed at Gil Vicente FC, thus making his debut in the Primeira Liga.

After a poor start to 2014–15, which saw the team lose the first three league matches, de Deus was relieved of his duties. On 6 October, he was hired by Sporting CP B on a one-year contract with the option of a second. He was sacked on 15 February 2017, after a 2–1 home loss to Varzim S.C. put the reserves into second-last place.

On 21 March 2017, de Deus returned to the top flight with C.D. Nacional, becoming the third manager of the season for the last-placed side. He left on 24 May, after their relegation in the same position.

De Deus was hired at Indian Super League franchise NorthEast United FC on 17 July 2017. The team from Guwahati dismissed him the following 2 January, having won once and scored twice in seven games.

Having already assisted him at Al Hilal SFC in Saudi Arabia, de Deus was one of six compatriots that Portuguese manager Jorge Jesus named in his staff at Brazilian club Clube de Regatas do Flamengo in June 2019, being appointed assistant along with Tiago Oliveira. In November, as Jesus was suspended, he led the team in the 3–1 home win against Esporte Clube Bahia for the Série A as an interim, being chosen the round's best coach.

De Deus followed Jesus to S.L. Benfica in 2020; the following 28 January he covered the ill manager's absence in a 3–1 home win over B-SAD in the quarter-finals of the Taça de Portugal. In 2022, they moved to Fenerbahçe SK.

Managerial statistics

References

External links

1976 births
Living people
Sportspeople from Setúbal
Portuguese footballers
Association football defenders
Liga Portugal 2 players
Segunda Divisão players
Vitória F.C. players
C.D. Beja players
Seixal F.C. players
G.D. Estoril Praia players
Lusitano G.C. players
F.C. Barreirense players
Portuguese football managers
Segunda División B managers
AD Ceuta managers
Primeira Liga managers
Liga Portugal 2 managers
S.C. Farense managers
Atlético Clube de Portugal managers
U.D. Oliveirense managers
Gil Vicente F.C. managers
Sporting CP B managers
C.D. Nacional managers
Indian Super League head coaches
NorthEast United FC managers
Campeonato Brasileiro Série A managers
CR Flamengo managers
Cape Verde national football team managers
Portuguese expatriate football managers
Expatriate football managers in Cape Verde
Expatriate football managers in Spain
Expatriate football managers in India
Expatriate football managers in Cyprus
Expatriate football managers in Brazil
Portuguese expatriate sportspeople in Cape Verde
Portuguese expatriate sportspeople in Spain
Portuguese expatriate sportspeople in India
Portuguese expatriate sportspeople in Cyprus
Portuguese expatriate sportspeople in Saudi Arabia
Portuguese expatriate sportspeople in Brazil
Portuguese expatriate sportspeople in Turkey
Fenerbahçe S.K. (football) non-playing staff